Nickel(II) fluoride is the chemical compound with the formula NiF2. It is an ionic compound of nickel and fluorine and forms yellowish to green tetragonal crystals.  Unlike many fluorides, NiF2 is stable in air.

Nickel(II) fluoride is also produced when nickel metal is exposed to fluorine. In fact, NiF2 comprises the passivating surface that forms on nickel alloys (e.g. monel) in the presence of hydrogen fluoride or elemental fluorine. For this reason, nickel and its alloys are suitable materials for storage and transport these fluorine and related fluorinating agents.  NiF2 is also used as a catalyst for the synthesis of chlorine pentafluoride.

Preparation and structure
NiF2 is prepared by treatment of anhydrous nickel(II) chloride with fluorine at 350 °C:
NiCl2  +  F2  →  NiF2  +  Cl2

The corresponding reaction of cobalt(II) chloride results in oxidation of the cobalt, whereas nickel remains in the +2 oxidation state after fluorination because its +3 oxidation state is less stable. Chloride is more easily oxidized than nickel(II). This is a typical halogen displacement reaction, where a halogen plus a less active halide makes the less active halogen and the more active halide.

Like some other metal difluorides, NiF2 crystallizes in the rutile structure, which features octahedral Ni centers and planar fluorides.

Reactions 
A melt of NiF2 and KF reacts to give successively potassium trifluoronickelate and potassium tetrafluoronickelate:
NiF2 + KF  →  K[NiF3]  
K[NiF3] + KF  →  K2[NiF4]

The structure of this material is closely related to some superconducting oxide materials.

Nickel(II) fluoride reacts with strong bases to give nickel(II) hydroxide:
NiF2 + 2 NaOH → Ni(OH)2 + 2 NaF

References

External links 

IARC Monograph "Nickel and Nickel compounds"
National Pollutant Inventory - Fluoride compounds fact sheet
 National Pollutant Inventory - Nickel and compounds fact sheet

Nickel compounds
Fluorides
Metal halides